Soufiane El Banouhi (born 26 July 1992) is a Belgian footballer who is currently playing for Lokeren-Temse in the Belgian Division 2.

El Banouhi started his footballing career with RWDM Brussels where he stayed until 2013 when he moved to WS Brussels. At WS Brussels he played three seasons, during the first two he was a first team regular but the third season saw him only playing one match. El Banouhi thereafter moved to OH Leuven playing in the Belgian First Division B where he again featured in the first team.

Personal life
Born in Belgium, El Banouhi is of Moroccan descent.

References

External links
 

1992 births
Living people
Footballers from Brussels
Belgian footballers
Belgian sportspeople of Moroccan descent
Challenger Pro League players
R.W.D.M. Brussels F.C. players
RWS Bruxelles players
Oud-Heverlee Leuven players
Royale Union Saint-Gilloise players
Lommel S.K. players
K.M.S.K. Deinze players
Association football defenders